Montserrat Martí (born 15 November 1972), also known as Montsita, is a Spanish soprano.

Early life
Martí was born as Montserrat Martí Caballé in Barcelona on 15 November 1972 to Montserrat Caballé and Bernabé Martí. She made her first appearance as a singer in 1993, singing with her mother in London. Following that, the mother and daughter sang together on a few occasions both on stage and on recordings.

Career 
In her early life, it was Vangelis who asked her mother if Martí also sang. It was the first time they sang together, and mother and daughter felt an emotional connection that lasted all their lives.

In 1998, Martí moved to Germany to begin her career as an opera singer. In the same year, she played the role of Zerlina in Mozart’s Don Giovanni at the Hamburg State Opera.

Martí has sung in various classical halls and opera houses worldwide, such as Gran Teatre del Liceu, Palau de la Música Catalana and Teatro Real in Spain; Bolshoi Theatre and Mariinsky Theatre in Russia; Deutsche Oper Berlin, Alte Oper, Musikhalle and Oper der Stadt Köln in Germany; Teatro alla Scala in Milan; Musikverein in Vienna; and the Royal Albert Hall in London.

Martí's repertoire includes roles in Leonard Bernstein’s West Side Story, Federico García Lorca’s La casa de Bernarda Alba, Jules Massenet‘s Cléopâtre and La Vierge; Mozart's Così fan tutte and Don Giovanni; and Puccini’s Edgar and Le Villi.

Martí has also collaborated in numerous charity concerts such as Rwanda in 1994 and in Prague for children with disabilities under the Olga Havel Foundation.

Family
Martí married businessman Carlos de Navas Mur on 14 August 2006. They divorced in October 2007. Since 2009 she has been in a relationship with businessman Daniel Faidella. They have a daughter, Daniela, born in Barcelona on 3 September 2011.

References

External Links
 
 

1972 births
Living people
Opera singers from Catalonia
Spanish operatic sopranos
Singers from Barcelona
21st-century Spanish  women opera singers